The Outer Ring Road (ORR), officially renamed as Dr. Puneeth Rajkumar Vartula Raste, is a ring road that runs around most of the perimeter of the city of Bangalore, Karnataka, India. This  road was developed by the Bangalore Development Authority and different sections were opened progressively between 1996 and 2002. IT firms on the Outer Ring Road generate revenue of US$ 22 billion every year, accounting for 32% of Bengaluru’s total IT revenue.

The Outer Ring Road connects all major highways around the city – Tumakuru Road (NH 48), Airport Road (NH 44), Old Madras Road (NH 75), Hosur Road (NH 44), Bannerghatta Road (SH 87), Kanakapura Road (NH 948), Mysuru Road (NH 275) and Magadi Road (SH 85).  It passes through major neighborhoods and suburbs such as Hebbala, Banaswadi, Krishnarajapuram, Mahadevapuram, Marathahalli, HSR Layout, Madiwala, BTM Layout, JP Nagar, Banashankari, Kengeri, Bangalore University, Nagarbhavi, Nandini Layout, Kengeri Satellite Town and Gokula.

Initially conceived to keep the truck traffic out of downtown Bangalore, the city has outgrown the Outer Ring Road. Nandi Infrastructure Corporation Limited has almost completed another partial ring road around Bangalore as a part of the Bangalore–Mysore Infrastructure Corridor (BMIC) project. The BDA and BMRDA have planned three more ring roads beyond the existing ring road. The first of these, the Peripheral Ring Road (PRR) will run a few kilometres beyond the BMIC-PRR. The second and third of these will be known as the Intermediate Ring Road (IRR) and the Satellite Towns Ring Road (STRR) respectively.

See also
 Namma Metro
 NICE Road
 Inner Ring Road, Bangalore
 Bengaluru Elevated Tollways
 Outer Ring Road, Hyderabad

References

External links 

Roads in Bangalore
Ring roads in India